Love to Burn is a fully orchestrated album by B. J. Thomas, released in 2007, and the first studio release from him in a decade.  With his daughters grown, the five time Grammy award winner was encouraged to return to the studio by the fan reception for his Raindrops and Boondocks Tour attendance. It was also a reintroduction of his hit single, "Raindrops Keep Fallin' on My Head" in the film Spider-Man 2 (2004).

Track list

References

External links 
 
 Love to Burn on Country Music Television

B. J. Thomas albums
2007 albums